The We Own the Night Tour was the third and final concert tour by American band Selena Gomez & the Scene, in support of their third and final studio album, When the Sun Goes Down.

Background

On March 23, 2011, Hollywood Records announced through a press release that Selena Gomez & The Scene would be touring in the United States and Canada during the summer of 2011. The first show confirmed was at the Orange County Fair in Costa Mesa, Calif, while sales started on April 2, 2011. "I am so excited to see my incredible fans on tour", Gomez said in a statement, that confirmed the tour name as We Own the Night Tour. "We're working on a great production and set lists including some surprise covers. I want to make sure everyone has a fun time."

The surprise cover was later revealed to be a tribute to American recording artist Britney Spears. Gomez further stated that Spears' Dream Within a Dream Tour was the first concert she attended. Nearly 30 tour dates were confirmed a few days later. When asked about the tour, Gomez stated.
"I am very excited to be on my first headlining tour. I'm nervous more than anything because I feel like there's going to be a bit of expectation [...] I am so excited to see my incredible fans on tour. We're working a great production and set lists, including some surprise covers. I want to make sure everyone has a fun time. [...] I think with this whole tour, I'm trying my best to be as creative as possible", she explains. "So, there's going to be a production, there's going to be videos, effects, dancers, a lot of glitter ... I just wanted to make it feel like a rave."

Set list

"A Year Without Rain" 
"Hit the Lights"
"Summer's Not Hot"
"Round & Round"
"The Way I Loved You"
"We Own the Night"
"Love You Like a Love Song"
"Spotlight"
"Bang Bang Bang"
"When the Sun Goes Down"
"Intuition"
"Falling Down"
"Super Bass"
"Rock God"
"Middle of Nowhere"
"My Dilemma"
"Off the Chain"
"...Baby One More Time" / "(You Drive Me) Crazy" / "I'm A Slave 4 U" / "Oops!... I Did It Again" / "Toxic" / "Hold It Against Me"
"Whiplash"
"Tell Me Something I Don't Know"
"Naturally"

Encore
 "Who Says"
"Magic"

Source:

Tour dates

Festivals and other miscellaneous performances

Box office score data

References

External links
 Selena Gomez & the Scene's Official Website

2011 concert tours
2012 concert tours 
Farewell concert tours
Selena Gomez & the Scene concert tours